General elections were held in Tunisia on 24 October 1999 to elect a President and Chamber of Deputies. For the first time ever there was more than one candidate in the presidential election; the longstanding requirement for prospective candidates to get at least 30 endorsements had been lifted months earlier. However, incumbent Zine El Abidine Ben Ali easily won a third five-year term with a reported 99.4 percent of the vote. His Constitutional Democratic Rally won 148 of the 183 seats in the Chamber of Deputies. Voter turnout was 92%.

Results

President

Parliament

References

Tunisia
Elections in Tunisia
General election
Presidential elections in Tunisia
Tunisian general election